Fernanda Silva (born 1 September 1958) is a Brazilian former volleyball player. She competed at the 1980 Summer Olympics and the 1984 Summer Olympics.

References

External links
 

1958 births
Living people
Brazilian women's volleyball players
Olympic volleyball players of Brazil
Volleyball players at the 1980 Summer Olympics
Volleyball players at the 1984 Summer Olympics
People from Araraquara
Sportspeople from São Paulo (state)
Pan American Games medalists in volleyball
Pan American Games bronze medalists for Brazil
Medalists at the 1979 Pan American Games